Downtown Train is a compilation album by Rod Stewart released in March 1990 only in the United States by Warner Bros. Records.

The album is made up of twelve tracks from the previously released Storyteller Anthology.  The album is skewed toward the more recent period of Stewart's career, most of the songs dating after 1980.  Included, however, is Stay with Me, a contemporary sounding song from 1971.  This is also the only song on Downtown Train that is not from his solo catalog, though Storyteller includes ten.  In the US, Downtown Train would peak at #20 and in 1995, it would be double platinum.

Track listing
All songs previously released on Storyteller - The Complete Anthology: 1964–1990

"Stay With Me" (Rod Stewart, Ron Wood) – 4:38
"Tonight's the Night (Gonna Be Alright)" (Stewart) – 3:56
"The Killing of Georgie (Part I and II)" (Stewart) – 6:27
"Passion" (Phil Chen, Jim Cregan, Gary Grainger, Kevin Savigar, Stewart) – 5:32
"Young Turks" (Carmine Appice, Duane Hitchings, Savigar, Stewart) – 5:02
"Infatuation" (Hitchings, Rowland Robinson, Stewart) – 5:13
"People Get Ready" (Curtis Mayfield) – 4:53
"Forever Young" (Cregan, Savigar, Bob Dylan, Stewart) – 4:04
"My Heart Can't Tell You No" (Simon Climie, Dennis Morgan) – 5:13
"I Don't Want to Talk About It" (Danny Whitten) – 4:53
"This Old Heart of Mine (Is Weak for You)" (Lamont Dozier, Edward Holland, Jr., Brian Holland, Sylvia Moy) – 4:11
"Downtown Train" (Tom Waits) – 4:39

Charts

Weekly charts

Year-end charts

Certifications

References

1990 compilation albums
Rod Stewart compilation albums
Warner Records compilation albums